The  is the 39th edition of the Japan Academy Film Prize, an award presented by the Nippon Academy-Sho Association to award excellence in filmmaking. It awarded the best films of 2015 and it took place on March 4, 2016 at the Grand Prince Hotel New Takanawa in Tokyo, Japan.

Nominees

Awards

References

External links 
  - 

Japan Academy Film Prize
2016 in Japanese cinema
Japan Academy Film Prize
March 2016 events in Japan